Fioroni is an Italian surname. Notable people with the surname include:

Andrea Fioroni (Born 1969), Argentinian former female field hockey player
Giuseppe Fioroni (Born 1958), Italian politician and former Minister of Public Instruction
Michele Fioroni (Born 1965), Italian male former tennis player
Paul Fioroni (Born 1976), Canadian ice hockey player
Giovanni Andrea Fioroni (or Fiorini; 1716-1178), Italian classical composer, maestro di cappella and organist 

Italian-language surnames
it:Fioroni